Plai Phraya is a district (amphoe) in Krabi province, Thailand.

Geography
Neighboring districts are (from the north clockwise): Phanom, Phrasaeng, Chai Buri (all Surat Thani province); Khao Phanom and Ao Luek of Krabi Province; and Thap Put of Phang Nga province.

Khlong Phraya Wildlife Sanctuary is on the Surat Thani Province border.

History
The minor district (king amphoe) Plai Phraya was created on 15 June 1973, when the three tambons, Plai Phraya, Khao Khen, and Khao To, were split off from Ao Luek district. It was upgraded to a full district on 12 April 1977.

Administration
The district is divided into four sub-districts (tambons), which are further subdivided into 33 villages (mubans). Plai Phraya has township  (thesaban tambon) status, covering parts of tambon Plai Phraya. Each of the tambons is administrated by a tambon administrative organization (TAO).

References

External links
amphoe.com

Districts of Krabi province